The Sri Lankan cricket team toured India in February and March 2022 to play two Test and three Twenty20 International (T20I) matches. The Test series formed part of the 2021–2023 ICC World Test Championship. In September 2021, the Board of Control for Cricket in India (BCCI) confirmed the schedule for the tour. In January 2022, Sri Lanka Cricket made a request to play the T20I matches first, as the T20I squad would be coming straight from their tour of Australia. In early February, the change was agreed by both boards, with Bangalore hosting a day/night Test match, with the BCCI confirming the revised tour schedule.

On 2 February 2022, Sri Lankan fast bowler Suranga Lakmal announced that he would retire from all forms of international cricket following the series. On 19 February 2022, India named their squads for the matches, with Rohit Sharma appointed as their new Test captain. On 26 February 2022, it was announced that the first match of the Test series would be played behind closed doors, with spectators being allowed to attend the second Test match. However, on 1 March 2022, the crowd capacity for the first Test was increased to 50%.

In the first T20I match, India made 199/2 from their 20 overs, going on to win the fixture by 62 runs. India won the second T20I by seven wickets to win the series with a match to play. India won the third and final T20I match by six wickets to win the series 3–0.

The first Test of the series was the 300th to be played by Sri Lanka, and it was also the 100th Test match for India's Virat Kohli. In the Test, Ravindra Jadeja scored 175 not out and took nine wickets. India went on to win the match inside three days, by the margin of an innings and 222 runs. The second Test also finished in three days, with India winning by 238 runs to win the series 2–0.

Squads

Prior to the T20I matches, Deepak Chahar and Suryakumar Yadav were both ruled out India's squad due to a hamstring injury and a hairline fracture respectively. Both players picked up their injuries during the third and final T20I match against the West Indies. Sri Lanka's Wanindu Hasaranga was also ruled out of the T20I series after not recovering from COVID-19.

After the first T20I match, Maheesh Theekshana and Shiran Fernando were both ruled out of Sri Lanka's squad for the remaining matches due to injuries. Wanindu Hasaranga and Maheesh Theekshana were replaced by Dhananjaya de Silva and Niroshan Dickwella in Sri Lanka's T20I squad. In India's T20I team, Ruturaj Gaikwad was replaced by Mayank Agarwal for the remaining two matches. India's Ishan Kishan was ruled out of the third T20I, after suffering a blow to the head in the second match.

Ahead of the second Test, India released Kuldeep Yadav from their squad, adding Axar Patel in his place. Pathum Nissanka and Dushmantha Chameera were both ruled out of Sri Lanka's squad for the second Test due to injuries.

T20I series

1st T20I

2nd T20I

3rd T20I

Test series

1st Test

2nd Test

Statistics

Most runs (T20i)

Most runs (Test)

Most wickets (T20i)

Most wickets (Test)

Notes

References

External links
 Series home at ESPN Cricinfo

2022 in Indian cricket
2022 in Sri Lankan cricket
International cricket competitions in 2021–22
Sri Lankan cricket tours of India